Pilar Garrido Corrales (born August 22, 1939) is a Filipino pop singer, songwriter, actress, comedian and television presenter. She is dubbed "Asia's Queen of Songs" and is widely known for her rendition of "Kapantay ay Langit" which eventually became her signature song.

Corrales was among the most successful Filipino musical artists in the 1960s. She was one of the first female artists to reach number one on the Australian music chart with her 1959 single "Come Closer to Me." In 1963, her single "A Million Thanks to You" became one of the few songs by local artists to reach number one on the Philippine chart in the 1960s.

She became a judge on the first season of The X Factor Philippines, which began airing in 2012.

Biography

Early life
Pilar Garrido Corrales was born on August 22, 1937, at Lahug, Cebu City, to José Corrales and María Garrido.
Her cousin,  Annie Corrales, was Miss Philippines in 1957 and married the businessman Eddie Woolbright.
After finishing her studies at Colegio de la Inmaculada Concepción in Cebu, she went to a finishing school (charm school) in Spain at the Colegio Mayor de Padre Poveda.

Career
In 1957, Corrales began her recording career after arriving in Australia for a brief period. She left her legacy by becoming the first woman to make the Australian pop charts with a local recording called "Come Closer to Me". She became a star of the Victoria Television circuit and her first hit, "Come Closer to Me", became part of a collection on which she is billed as one of the "Grand Dames of Victorian Radio and Television".

Corrales was among the first female artists to top the Australian pop music charts. She also recorded at least three LPs in the late 1950s and early 1960s: Pilita with Arthur Young: Pilita Tells the Story of Love, I'll Take Romance and This Is Pilita under Astor Records. Being one of the pioneers of Australia's early television years, a street was named after her in Victoria. The Australian Broadcasting Corporation (ABC) featured Corrales and several pioneering female artists in Australia in the 2nd episode of the highly acclaimed TV special, Love is in the Air. Corrales returned to Manila in 1963 to pursue a career in the Philippine music industry. Her Philippine career began when she hosted a radio program La Taverna over DZPI where she sang Spanish songs and played the guitar. She performed regularly in stage shows at the Manila Grand Opera House. Subsequently, her reputation grew and during her international stints, she has performed with internationally acclaimed artists like Sammy Davis Jr., the Beatles and on July 4, 1966, Bob Hope, Pat Boone, Frank Sinatra and Julie Andrews. She also appeared in movies, most of them musicals. Her film debut was a lead role in the 1968 film Miss Wawaw and was followed by 11 films for the next two years. Corrales later recorded songs in Spanish in the early 1960s as well as songs in English, Tagalog and Cebuano during the 1970s under Vicor Music Corporation. Her multi-awarded TV program at ABS-CBN, An Evening with Pilita (1965–1972), is widely considered as one of the benchmarks in Philippine broadcasting history.

Corrales frequently performed for Seeing Stars with Joe Quirino on IBC-Channel 13 after the martial law years where she demonstrated her range as a gifted performer of Spanish, English, Cebuano and Tagalog music. Aquarius Record Philippines produced a compilation of Pilita's Spanish songs on CDs like Noche de Ronda, Vaya Con Dios. Her signature song A Million Thanks to You by Alice Doria-Gamilla was translated into seven languages. She eventually recorded songs composed by Filipino composers like Danny Holmsen, George Canseco, Willy Cruz, Ryan Cayabyab and several others. Under Vicor Records, Corrales interpreted numerous Filipino classics and introduced them to younger audiences.

Corrales first met Canseco in Your Evening with Pilita (aired on pre-Martial Law ABS-CBN) as a guest in the composers' portion of the show". For the show Canseco brought with him You're All I Love. Canseco later wrote Filipino lyrics for the song, which became Kapantay ay Langit, the first song Canseco sold to a record label in 1966. The song was first recorded by Amapola aka Maria Cabase for the movie theme of Kapantay ay Langit starring Marlene Dauden and Eddie Rodríguez. The song won for George Canseco and Amapola the Manila Film Festival award for best song of the year. The song did not fare well commercially, because Amapola had left (for her U.S. concert tours) and the song was not promoted properly, according to Canseco during an interview with the Philippine Daily Inquirer. But when Corrales revived the song, it turned into a classic and defied trends and time. "The song," Corrales said, "was included in my album Philippine Love Songs Vol. 1, which was released in the early 1970s."

Through the personal invitation of Sammy Davis Jr., Corrales became the first Filipino to sing in Caesars Palace. In her concert in Caesars Palace, Las Vegas during the late '70s, Corrales sang Spanish, English, Cebuano and Tagalog songs, all conducted and arranged by Ryan Cayabyab.

After receiving a 1965 Philippine Citizen's Award for TV as Best TV Female Performer, Corrales went on to receive Cecil, Aliw, Tinig and Awit and several other awards for her performances and lifetime achievement. In 1990, she received a Merit Award from the FAMAS Awards. In 1991, she was given a Lifetime Achievement Award by the Philippine Association of the Record Industry (PARI) for bringing Filipino musical artistry to an international audience. She was the first Filipino to win at an international music festival by bagging the Best Performer Award during the 1st Tokyo Music Festival (1972) where she bested numerous international artists, including Olivia Newton-John.

She operates a restaurant bar in Greenhills named: PILITA'S, in one of Manila's prime commercial districts. She is a highly acclaimed host and comedy actress on Philippine television with over 135 albums to her credit and an international profile and appearances in Asia, the Middle East, Australia and North America.

In 2006, Corrales was selected by Associated Broadcasting Company (ABC Channel 5, now TV5, formerly The 5 Network) and FremantleMedia to be one of the celebrity judges for the first-ever nationwide search for the Philippine Idol together with composer Ryan Cayabyab and rapper Francis Magalona. She was a judge in the first Asian Idol held in Indonesia, representing Philippine Idol.

Personal life
Corrales has two children, Jackielou Blanco and Ramon Christopher Gutierrez. Her children are also well-known celebrities in the Philippine film industry. Corrales was married in 1963 to the late Spanish executive businessman Gonzalo Blanco and separated while her daughter was still a child. Gonzalo died in 1981.

Corrales gave birth to her second child, Ramón Christopher Gutierrez, in 1971, known to be the father of Janine Gutierrez. Ramón Christopher's father is Filipino actor Eddie Gutierrez. Corrales also has an adopted son, VJ. On May 22, 2001, Corrales married Paraguayan/Australian businessman Carlos López.

Filmography

Television

Film

Discography

Albums

Australia
Come Closer to Me
Pilita with Arthur Young: I'll Take Romance
This Is Pilita
Pilita Tells the Story of Love

Philippines (including albums released internationally)
Pilita, Live at the Riviera
Pilita, Live at the Riviera Vol. 2
Pilita, Live at the Riviera Vol. 3
Pilita, Now
Pilita Sings
Para Ti Mama
Love
Pilita in Motion
Pilita Corrales: Greatest Hits
Pilita: Greatest Hits Vol. 2
Matud Nila (Cebuano)
Philippine Love Songs
Philippine Love Songs Vol. 2
Kapantay Ay Langit
A Song for You
Sampaguita
Best of Philippine Pop Songs
Sa Tanang Panahon (mostly Cebuano versions of Tagalog songs)
Minamahal, Sinasamba
Oh La La! (1971)
For Love's Sake Only (1971)
Pilita in Tokyo (1972)
Filipiniana (1972)
Pilita: The Queen of Songs (Ang Mutya ng Awit)
Pilita, Christmas Special
Gaano Kadalas ang Minsan?
The Best of Philippine Music
Salakot
Pagsapit ng Pasko
Araw-araw, Gabi-gabi
Pilita: Visayan Love Songs Vol. 1 (Cebuano)
Pilita Sings George (If I Had My Life to Live Again)
Pilita: Great Songs from Filipino Movies
Sa Aking Pag-iisa
Walang Pagmamaliw
Pilita Sings...Love Themes from Viva Films
Pilita y Amado en Español
Pilita Y Amado en Español, Vol. 2
Pilita Goes Pop (OctoArts now PolyEast Records, 1990)
Ang Nag-iisang si Pilita (Viva Records, 1994)
Together at Last (with Elmo Makuil) (Quantum Music Corporation, 1996)
When My Eyes Are Filled with Tears (Dyna Records)
Pilita Corrales Sings Visayan Songs (Cebuano) (Villar)
If You Go Away
Hoy
Pilita y los mensajeros del Paraguay
Viajar ("Travel")
Abrázame ("Embrace Me")
Yukbo sa Bisayanhong Awit (Cebuano and Ilonggo duet album with Susan Fuentes)
A Million Thanks to You

Recorded songs

 "A Million Thanks to You" (1963)
 Ako Raw Ay Makasalanan
 Ampingan Mo ba
 Ang Dalaga Noon at Ngayon
 Ang Diwa ng Pasko
 Ang Kawayan
 Ang Pag-ibig
 Ang Pag-ibig ay Mahiwaga
 Ang Pipit (true)
 Ang Tangi Kong Pag-ibig
 Apat na Dahilan
 Awit ng Labandera
 Awit ng Mananahi
 Ay Pag-ibig
 Ay, Ay, Ay Pag-ibig
 Ayaw nang Magmahal
 Bakas ng Lumipas
 Bakasin Mo sa Gunita
 Bakit Kita Inibig
 Balud sa Kalimot
 Balut
 Baryo Fiesta
 Basta't Magkasama Tayo
 Basta't Mahal Kita
 Bisan sa Damgo Lang
 Buhat
 Bulak Akong Bukidnon
 Cariñosa
 Come Close and Love Me
 Dahil sa Isang Bulaklak
 Dahil sa Iyo
 Dalagang Pilipina
 Dalagang Pilipinhon
 Dalawang Filipina
 Di Ko Kasalanan
 Di na Iibig
 Dili na Mausab
 Gipangita Ko Ikaw
 Goodbye
 Had I Known It
 Hanggang Langit Mahal Kita
 Hinahanap Kita
 Hinugpong nga Mga Awit
 Hiwaga ng Pag-ibig
 Huling Halakhak
 Ibong Kakanta-kanta
 If I Had My Life to Live Again
 Iibigin Ka
 Ikaw ang Mahal Ko
 Ikaw Na Lamang
 Iniibig Kita
 Ipagdarasal Kita
 Irog Ako ay Mahalin
 Isumbong Ko Ikaw sa Langit
 Iyong-iyo Kailan pa Man
 Kahit Sino Ka Man
 Kamingaw Gayud
 Kapantay ay Langit (Original by Amapola in 1970; later covered in 1972; Sharon Cuneta for the film of the same title in 1994 with her co-star Richard Gomez; Re-recorded feat. King of Soul Janno Gibbs in Janno's 2002 Album by VIVA Records).
 Kataka-taka
 Katulog na Inday
 Kay Hirap ng Umibig
 Kay Langit Ko ang Gugma Mo
 Kung Batid Mo Lamang
 Kung Kita'y Kapiling
 Kung Nagsasayaw Kita
 Lahat ng Araw
 Lahat ng Gabi Bawat Araw
 Lahat ng Oras
 Lamok
 Landas sa Pag-ibig
 Larawan ng Pag-ibig
 Let's Forget The Time
 Lihim na Damdamin
 Lonely Nights
 Luluha Ka Rin
 Maalaala Mo Kaya
 Magandang Gabi Po
 Mahal Kita Hanggang Langit
 Mahal Mo Ba Ako?
 Mahiwaga
 Mamang Tsuper
 Mangga
 Mano Po Ninong
 Matagal na Rin
 Matud Nila (Visayan)
 May Ibong Kakanta Kanta
 Minamahal Kita
 Minamahal Ko Siya
 Minsan Ay Nakasama Kita
 Nahigwa-os
 O Maliwanag na Buwan
 Paano
 Pag-ibig Ikaw ang Dahilan
 Pagka't Kapiling Ka
 Pagkadali
 Pasko sa Nayon
 Patatawarin Kita
 Pilipinas
 Pobreng Alindahaw
 Porbida
 Puto Kutsinta
 Rosas Pandan
 Sa Araw ng Pasko (Ikaw Lang ang Siyang Kailangan)
 Sa Bawat Sandali
 Sa Libis ng Nayon
 Saan Ka Man Naroroon
 Salakot
 Salamat sa Alaala
 Sampaguita

 Sana Kahit Minsan (original by Ariel Rivera)
 Sapagkat Ikaw ay Akin
 Sapagkat Kami ay Tao lamang (Because We Are Only Human)
 Sapagkat Malapit na
 Sayaw sa Ilaw
 Sayo sa Kabuntagon
 Sinumpa Ko sa Diyos
 Sumpang Walang Hanggan
 Tama Na
 The Shadow of Your Smile [Live in Toronto]
 Titibok-Tibok
 Together
 Together at Last (duet with Elmo Makil)
 Tugoti Kami
 Tunay na Tunay
 Ulilang Puso
 Walang Kapantay
 When Eyes Are Filled with Tears
 Yesterday I Heard the Rain
 Noche de Ronda
 Vaya con Dios (Farewell)
 Historia de un amor (Story of a Love)
 Abrázame (Embrace Me)
 Obsesión
 Gracias amigo (Thanks my Friend)
 Solamente una vez (Just Once)
 Espérame en el cielo (Wait for Me in Heaven)
 La foto (The Picture)
 Hasta el fin de mi existir (Til the End of My Existence)
 Con estas manos (With These Hands)
 Filipinas
 Tema del padrino (Theme of the Godfather)
 Grande, Grande, Grande
 A flor de piel
 Quisiera saber (I'd Like to Know)
 Desde que tú has ido (Since You've Been Gone)
 Tu sonrisa (Your Smile)
 Concierto de un otoño
 Perfidia
 Aldila
 Angustia
 Río rebelde
 Voy (I Go)
 Amor (Love)
 Waray-Waray
 Nganong Mipakita Ka
 Sayri Ako
 Ngano Ba Gugma
 Ampinging mga Bulak
 Ilingaw-Lingaw Lang
 Mao Ba Kini ang Gugma
 Hain Ka na Pinangga
 Uhaw sa Gugma

References

External links
 Astor Records, Australia
 imdg.com
 She's leaving home (Love is in the air, ABC TV-Australia)
 Vicor Music Corporation
 Cebu’s divas
 Even Canseco was rejected, Pilita remembers by Nini Valera
 Olivia Newton-John at the 1st Tokyo Music Festival
 Kinks sa‘PI' auditions, areglado na
 Beyond Birit
 RP Idol's First Yield
 Toronto Canada Pilita Corrales Special International Guest 2011 & 2014 Hosted by Radio & Television Producer Joel Recla.

1939 births
Living people
Actresses from Cebu
Cebuano people
Filipino women pop singers
Filipino women comedians
Filipino expatriates in Australia
Filipino expatriates in Spain
20th-century Filipino women singers
Filipino film actresses
Filipino people of Spanish descent
Filipino television actresses
Filipino television personalities
Filipino songwriters
Singers from Cebu City
People from Sampaloc, Manila
Vicor Music artists
ABS-CBN personalities
GMA Network personalities